|}

The Prix Hocquart is a Group 2 flat horse race in France open to three-year-old thoroughbred colts and fillies. It is run over a distance of 2,400 metres (about 1 mile and 4 furlongs) at Chantilly.

History
The event was established in 1861, and it was originally called the Prix de Longchamps. In the early part of its history its distance was 2,500 metres. Due to the Franco-Prussian War, it was not run in 1871.

The Prix de Longchamps was one of several trials for the Prix du Jockey Club collectively known as the Poules des Produits. The others (listed by their modern titles) were the Prix Daru, the Prix Lupin, the Prix Noailles and the Prix Greffulhe. The Prix de Longchamps was restricted to the produce of mares covered by stallions born and bred in France. It was funded by entries submitted before a horse's birth, in the year of conception.

The race continued with its original title until 1884. It was renamed in memory of Louis Hocquart de Turtot (1823–1884), a founder member of the board of French horse racing, in 1885.

The Prix Hocquart was shortened to 2,400 metres in 1902. It was abandoned throughout World War I, with no running from 1915 to 1919. It was cancelled once during World War II, in 1940. It was contested at Le Tremblay over 2,300 metres from 1943 to 1945.

The event was staged at Chantilly over 2,200 metres from 1997 to 2000. Its distance at Longchamp was cut to 2,200 metres in 2005.

Twenty-seven winners of the race have achieved victory in the Prix du Jockey Club. The first was Patricien in 1867, and the most recent was Bering in 1986.

The race was moved permanently to Chantilly in 2017, and pushed back in the racing calendar to be run on the same day as the Prix de Diane.  It therefore functioned as a Grand Prix de Paris trial instead of a trial for the Prix du Jockey Club. In 2020 it returned to Longchamp and was run in late May on the same day as the Prix Saint-Alary.

Records

Leading jockey (5 wins):
 Yves Saint-Martin – Reliance (1965), Margouillat (1973), Darshaan (1984), Mouktar (1985), Sadjiyd (1987)
 Freddy Head – Bourbon (1971), Talleyrand (1972), Val de l'Orne (1975), Montcontour (1977), Mot d'Or (1980)

Leading trainer (7 wins):

 André Fabre – Jeu de Paille (1983), Nasr El Arab (1988), Dancehall (1989), Vadlawys (1994), Hurricane Run (2005), Democrate (2008), Tableaux (2013)

Leading owner (7 wins):
 Henri Delamarre – Matamore (1865), Victorieuse (1866), Patricien (1867), Faublas (1872), Filoselle (1876), Vesuve (1877), Vin Sec (1891)

Winners since 1979

Earlier winners

 1861: Good By
 1862: Allez y Rondement
 1863: Villafranca
 1864: Gedeon
 1865: Matamore
 1866: Victorieuse
 1867: Patricien
 1868: Le Bosphore
 1869: Pandour
 1870: Bigarreau
 1871: no race
 1872: Faublas
 1873: Absalon
 1874: Succes
 1875: Saint Cyr
 1876: Filoselle
 1877: Vesuve
 1878: Stathouder
 1879: Salteador
 1880: Versigny
 1881: Serpolette
 1882: Dictateur II
 1883: Farfadet
 1884: Silex
 1885: Extra
 1886: Upas
 1887: Vanneau
 1888: Saint Gall
 1889: Aerolithe
 1890: Yellow
 1891: Vin Sec
 1892: Fontenoy
 1893: Ragotsky
 1894: Polygone
 1895: Roitelet
 1896: Kerym
 1897: Canvass Back
 1898: Le Roi Soleil
 1899: Perth
 1900: Ivry
 1901: Saint Armel
 1902: Maximum
 1903: Ex Voto
 1904: Orange Blossom
 1905: Brienne
 1906: Maintenon
 1907: Pitti
 1908: Lieutel
 1909: Mehari
 1910: My Star
 1911: Faucheur
 1912: Zenith
 1913: Pere Marquette
 1914: Sardanapale
 1915–19: no race
 1920: Caliban
 1921: Ksar
 1922: Joyeux Drille
 1923: Massine
 1924: Vineuil
 1925: Belfonds
 1926: Soubadar
 1927: Flamant
 1928: Palais Royal
 1929: Hotweed
 1930: Veloucreme
 1931: Tourbillon
 1932: Bishop's Rock
 1933: Le Grand Cyrus
 1934: Maravedis
 1935: Louqsor
 1936: Mieuxce
 1937: Clairvoyant
 1938: Royal Gift
 1939: Irifle
 1940: no race
 1941: Le Pacha
 1942: Hern the Hunter
 1943: Verso II
 1944: Ardan
 1945: Chanteur
 1946: Adrar
 1947: Timor
 1948: My Love
 1949: Val Drake
 1950: L'Amiral
 1951: Sicambre
 1952: Auriban
 1953: Fort de France
 1954: Prince Rouge
 1955: Rapace
 1956: Floriados
 1957: Argel
 1958: San Roman
 1959: Herbager
 1960: Angers
 1961: Moutiers
 1962: Val de Loir
 1963: Le Mesnil
 1964: Free Ride
 1965: Reliance
 1966: Hauban
 1967: Frontal
 1968: Valmy
 1969: Beaugency
 1970: Gyr
 1971: Bourbon
 1972: Talleyrand *
 1973: Margouillat
 1974: Poil de Chameau
 1975: Val de l'Orne
 1976: Grandchant
 1977: Montcontour
 1978: Frere Basile

* The 1972 winner Talleyrand was later renamed Hakodate.

See also
 List of French flat horse races
 Recurring sporting events established in 1861 – the Prix Hocquart is included under its original title, Prix de Longchamps.

References

 France Galop / Racing Post:
 galop.courses-france.com:
 1861–1889, 1890–1919, 1920–1949, 1950–1979, 1980–present

 france-galop.com – A Brief History: Prix Hocquart.
 galopp-sieger.de – Prix Hocquart.
 horseracingintfed.com – International Federation of Horseracing Authorities – Prix Hocquart (2016).
 pedigreequery.com – Prix Hocquart – Longchamp.
 tbheritage.com – Prix Hocquart.

Flat horse races for three-year-olds
Longchamp Racecourse
Horse races in France